THIQ is a drug used in scientific research, which is the first non-peptide agonist developed that is selective for the melanocortin receptor subtype MC4. In animal studies, THIQ stimulated sexual activity in rats, but with little effect on appetite or inflammation. This supports possible application of MC4 selective agonists for the treatment of sexual dysfunction in humans, although THIQ itself has poor oral bioavailability and a short duration of action so improved analogues will need to be developed.

See also
 Bremelanotide
 Melanotan II
 PL-6983
 PF-00446687

References

Erectile dysfunction drugs
Female sexual dysfunction drugs
Melanocortin receptor agonists
Triazoles
Piperidines
Propionamides
Chloroarenes
Tetrahydroisoquinolines
Aphrodisiacs